Shahumyan is an administrative region of the Nagorno-Karabach Republic.

Shahumyan may also refer to:
Shahumyan, Ararat, Armenia
Shahumyan, Armavir, Armenia
Shahumyan, Lori, Armenia
Shahumyan, Yerevan, Armenia
Shahumyan or Shaumyanovsk in Soviet Azerbaijan, previously Nerkinshen, in 1992 renamed into Aşağı Ağcakənd (in Azerbaijan)

See also
Shaumyan (disambiguation)